By or BY may refer to:

Places 
 By, Doubs, France, a commune
 By, Norway, a village

Codes
 Belarus ISO country code
 .by, country-code top-level domain for Belarus
 Burundi FIPS Pub 10-4 and obsolete NATO digram country code
 TUI Airways IATA airline code, formerly Thomson Airways, Thomsonfly and Britannia Airways

Other uses 
 John By (1779–1836), British military engineer famous for his work in Canada
 CC-BY, a Creative Commons attribution license
 Budget year, a synonym for fiscal year

See also
 -by, a common suffix for settlements in northern England
Bye (disambiguation)